Conversations with Magic Stones, Figure Three is a public art work by English artist Barbara Hepworth located at the Lynden Sculpture Garden near Milwaukee, Wisconsin. The sculpture is an abstract, totemic form made of bronze; it is installed on the lawn. Originally, this work was created as part of a multi-part sculpture with two other "figures" (vertical abstract bronze sculptures)  and three "magic stones" (bronze eight-sided polyhedrons). One of these other works, Conversations with Magic Stones (Magic Stone Three), is also installed at the Lynden Sculpture Garden.

References

Outdoor sculptures in Milwaukee
1973 sculptures
Bronze sculptures in Wisconsin
Abstract sculptures in Wisconsin
1973 establishments in Wisconsin